Sylvie Vartan (commonly called Ta sorcière bien-aimée after the first track on side one is the 16th studio album by French singer Sylvie Vartan. It was released on an LP in 1976. It was arranged by Benoît Kaufman, Hervé Roy and Raymond Donnez.

Track listing

References

External links 
 Sylvie Vartan – Sylvie Vartan (Ta sorcière bien-aimée) at Discogs

Sylvie Vartan albums
1976 albums
RCA Victor albums